Kálmán Szepesi (13 January 1930 – 29 September 1992) was a male former international table tennis player from Hungary.

Table tennis career
He won several medals in doubles, and team events in the World Table Tennis Championships in 1951 to 1955.
Szepesi's five World Championship medals included two gold medals; one in the team event and one in the mixed doubles at the 1955 World Table Tennis Championships with Éva Kóczián. He also won an English Open title.

See also
 List of table tennis players
 List of World Table Tennis Championships medalists

References

1930 births
1992 deaths
Hungarian male table tennis players
20th-century Hungarian people